Thérèse Auguste Zafy born Zafimahova is a Malagasy political figure and activist who served as First Lady of Madagascar from 1991 until 1996. She is the widow of former President Albert Zafy, who died in 2017.

Zafy, a member of the Antesaka people, was born Thérèse Auguste Zafimahova to parents, Antoine Zafimahova and Marie Anne Kemba. She and Albert Zafy married during the 1960s in a traditional Antankarana wedding ceremony. The couple had three children - Aimé Zafy, Sylvie Zafy, and Richard "Titus" Zafy.

She survived her husband, who died of complications from a stroke at Saint Pierre Hospital in Réunion on October 13, 2017.

References

Date of birth unknown
Year of birth unknown 
First ladies of Madagascar
Malagasy democracy activists